Samuel Afum (born December 24, 1990) is a Ghanaian footballer who plays as a forward.

Career
In Ghana he played for Hearts of Oak. In the 2009–10 season he was Ghana Premier League joint top scorer with 13 goals.

In the following season he signed for Egyptian newly promoted side Smouha Sporting Club. In his second season with the club, he scored 7 goals, making him topscorer of Smouha, before the cancellation of the Egyptian Premier League. He was also the eleventh top-scorer in the Egyptian League in 2012.

In January 2013 he was transferred to Swiss club Young Boys for an undisclosed fee.

Afum then played for Egyptian side Wadi Degla.

In July 2018 he returned to Europe this time by signing with Serbian side FK Spartak Subotica. In December 2018, Afum was signed by FC Ilves. His departure from the club was announced at the end of June 2019, after getting his contract terminated by mutual consent.

Honours
Joint-topscorer in the Ghanaian Premier League in 2009–10 with 13 goals.

References

External links
 

1990 births
Living people
Footballers from Accra
Ghanaian footballers
Ghanaian expatriate footballers
Swiss Super League players
BSC Young Boys players
Expatriate footballers in Switzerland
Expatriate footballers in Egypt
Accra Hearts of Oak S.C. players
FK Spartak Subotica players
Serbian SuperLiga players
Expatriate footballers in Serbia
Association football forwards
Ghana Premier League top scorers